Mormolyca ringens is a species of orchid native to Mexico, Belize and Central America.

References

External links 

Maxillariinae
Orchids of Mexico
Orchids of Central America
Orchids of Belize
Plants described in 1840